Bossa Nova Plus (also released as Shuckin') is an album by saxophonist Willis Jackson which was recorded in 1962 and released on the Prestige label.

Reception

Allmusic awarded the album 4 stars stating "His second great album that year".

Track listing 
 "Cachita" (Rafael Hernández) – 3:47  
 "I Left My Heart in San Francisco" (George Cory, Douglass Cross) – 3:21  
 "Amor" (Ricardo López Méndez, Gabriel Ruíz) – 7:48
 "Mama Inez" (L. Wolfe Gilbert, Eliseo Grenet) –   
 "What Kind of Fool Am I?" (Leslie Bricusse, Anthony Newley) – 5:09 
 "Shuckin'" (Willis Jackson) – 5:27

Personnel 
Willis Jackson – tenor saxophone
Tommy Flanagan – piano
Kenny Burrell – guitar 
Eddie Calhoun – bass
Roy Haynes – drums
Juan Amalbert, Montego Joe – congas
Jose Paulo – congas, timbales

References 

Willis Jackson (saxophonist) albums
1962 albums
Prestige Records albums
Albums recorded at Van Gelder Studio